Ann Die Hasselmo was president of Hendrix College from 1992 to 2001, and served as chair of the National Association of Independent Colleges and Universities (NAICU). She is currently the president of the American Academic Leadership Institute.

Biography
Ann Die Hasselmo graduated summa cum laude from Lamar University, and received a Ph.D. in counseling psychology from Texas A&M University. She became a Regents Professor at Lamar University, where she also served as President of the Faculty Senate. In 1986–87, Dr. Hasselmo was one of 29 Fellows of the American Council on Education and spent the administrative internship year in the President's office at the College of William and Mary. In 1988, she moved to Tulane University, where she was Dean of the H. Sophie Newcomb Memorial College and Associate Provost and Chair of the Newcomb Foundation's board of trustees.

Presidency
In 1992, Ann Die Hasselmo was appointed president of Hendrix College where she served until 2001. During her tenure as president of Hendrix, she served as chair of the board of directors of the National Association of Independent Colleges and Universities (NAICU) and represented NAICU on the board of directors of the American Council on Education (ACE). She also served as chair of the ACE's Council of Fellows and the Commission on Governmental Relations and served on the board of directors of the National Merit Scholarship Corporation and the Foundation for Independent Higher Education. She was Chair of the Presidents Council for Division III of the National Collegiate Athletic Association (NCAA), and was a member of the executive committee of the NCAA.

Recent positions
Hasselmo went on to be managing director of Academic Search Consultation Service (ASCS) and is currently President of the American Academic Leadership Institute (AALI) in Washington, D.C. She also sits on the board of Acxiom Corporation.

References

Year of birth missing (living people)
Living people
Heads of universities and colleges in the United States
Hendrix College faculty
American women psychologists
21st-century American psychologists
21st-century American women
Tulane University faculty
Women heads of universities and colleges